Leonid Vasilievich Tyagachyov (born October 10, 1946) is a Russian politician, sportsman and honorary president of the Russian Olympic Committee (ROC). Between 2001 and 2010, Tyagachyov served as President of the Russian Olympic Committee.

Early life 
Tyagachyov was a skier representing the Soviet Union and became champion of the USSR. During his time as a skier, he participated in several international competitions. Tyagachyov was champion of the USSR among teams of physical culture for football, and also a master of sports of the USSR in football.

Awards 
Order  For Merit to the Fatherland  3rd class
Order  For Merit to the Fatherland 4th class
 Order of Honour (1999)
 Order of Friendship of Peoples (1994)
 Medal  In Commemoration of the 850th Anniversary of Moscow (1997)
 Silver Olympic Order (2006)
 Honored Worker of Physical Culture of the Russian Federation (2007)

References

External links 
 Биография на сайте ОКР

1946 births
Living people
People from Dmitrovsky District, Moscow Oblast
United Russia politicians
Sports ministers
Members of the Federation Council of Russia (after 2000)
Soviet male alpine skiers
Recipients of the Order "For Merit to the Fatherland", 3rd class
Recipients of the Order of Honour (Russia)
Merited Coaches of the Soviet Union
Honoured Coaches of Russia
Recipients of the Order "For Merit to the Fatherland", 4th class
Presidents of the Russian Olympic Committee